The Rocks Estate, also known as the John Jacob Glessner Estate, is a historic summer estate in Bethlehem, New Hampshire. The estate was assembled by John Jacob Glessner (whose Chicago residence is a National Historic Landmark designed by H. H. Richardson) in the 1880s, and is one of the largest and best-preserved surviving private estates in the state. Glessner created The Rocks as a private conservation initiative, to prevent destructive farming methods from destroying the land.

The large Shingle-style house he had built in 1883 no longer stands, but a significant number of outbuildings survive, including a carriage house, horse barn, and a sawmill/pigpen building in a cluster of buildings located generally northward of the former house site. At least three of these buildings were designed by Chicago architect Hermann V. von Holst, and are of unusually high quality in their design and construction. There is a subsidiary area of the estate known as the Red Farm, centered on a c. 1840 farmhouse.

The estate was listed on the National Register of Historic Places in 1984. The property is now owned by the Society for the Protection of New Hampshire Forests and is open to the public. It is managed by that organization according to principles articulated by Glessner, preserving an important aspect of the property.

See also
National Register of Historic Places listings in Grafton County, New Hampshire

References

External links
The Rocks - SPNHF

Houses on the National Register of Historic Places in New Hampshire
Greek Revival houses in New Hampshire
Shingle Style architecture in New Hampshire
Houses completed in 1883
Houses in Grafton County, New Hampshire
National Register of Historic Places in Grafton County, New Hampshire
Bethlehem, New Hampshire